Ihor Bodnar is a paralympic athlete from Ukraine competing mainly in category T20 middle distance and sprint events.

Ihor competed in the 2000 Summer Paralympics winning a bronze medal in the 1500m and also competing in the 400m.

References

Paralympic athletes of Ukraine
Athletes (track and field) at the 2000 Summer Paralympics
Paralympic bronze medalists for Ukraine
Living people
Medalists at the 2000 Summer Paralympics
Year of birth missing (living people)
Paralympic medalists in athletics (track and field)
Ukrainian male middle-distance runners